Roberto Caruso (born 23 May 1967 in Sannicandro di Bari, Bari Province, in the region of Apulia) was an Italian road racing cyclist. Professional from 1991 to 1998, he won the Trois Vallées Varésines twice.

Major results
 1990
  stage of the Giro delle Regione
  in the Giro delle Regione
  in the Amateur Road World Championships

 1993
 Gran Premio di Lugano
  stage of the Vuelta al Táchira
  in the Giro del Lazio

 1995
 Trois Vallées Varésines
  in the Wincanton Classic

 1997
 Trois Vallées Varésines
  in the Giro della Romagna

Grand Tours results

Tour de France 
 1998 : abandoned after ( stage)

Giro d'Italia 
 1993 : 
 1996 : 
 1997 :

External links 
 

1967 births
Living people
People from Sannicandro di Bari
Italian male cyclists
Cyclists from Apulia
Sportspeople from the Metropolitan City of Bari